Anaël Lardy (born 24 October 1987) is a French basketball player for ASPTT Arras and the French national team, where she participated at the 2014 FIBA World Championship.

References

1987 births
Living people
French women's basketball players
Guards (basketball)
Place of birth missing (living people)